Cuomo may refer to:

 Cuomo, a surname of Italian origin
 Governor Cuomo (disambiguation), several governors named "Cuomo" (belonging to the Cuomo family)
 Cuomo family, a U.S. political family based in New York State
 The Cuomo Mag, aka "The Cuomo", a 3-D printed AR-15 gun ammunition clip magazine

See also
 Cuomo Prime Time, a primetime TV news magazine on CNN